The Scandinavian Festival is an annual four-day celebration of Scandinavian heritage in Junction City, Oregon, United States.  The small city of 6,052 people hosts more than 100,000 visitors each year.  Sunset Magazine rates it one of the best in the U.S. for its emphasis on authenticity.
The Oregon Heritage Tradition designation was awarded to the Scandinavian Festival in 2014.

History
The festival was started in 1961 by Dr. Gale Fletchall as a way to save a dying town. Downtown businesses were closing up, as the new Interstate 5 bypassed Junction City, diverting most of the traffic going through town on Oregon Route 99. It was then that Fletchall began searching for a rallying point for community spirit. He thought a citywide celebration would be ideal, but he was stumped for a theme. He considered and discarded several possibilities before settling on the most obvious, a celebration of the city’s very real but very dormant Scandinavian heritage. He talked the idea over with older Danish-American residents, and then secured financial backing from the chamber of commerce in May 1961. The first community classes in Scandinavian dancing and singing were organized a few weeks later, and church and civic organizations were persuaded to operate food and craft booths. In August 1961 the first annual Scandinavian Festival opened in temporary booths in downtown Junction City. Fletchall expected perhaps 2,000 visitors; he got 25,000. Today it is one of Oregon's most popular events.

No live festival was held in 2020, although most went virtual.

Activities
Since 1961, the city has attracted visitors nationally to the downtown area, which is transformed into an old world town for the occasion.
Each day of the festival highlights a particular Scandinavian country—Denmark, Sweden, Finland, and Norway.

Costumed Vikings march down the street, authentic northern European puppet shows are traditionally themed, and colorful costumes are displayed in a fashion show. Storytellers and actors highlight Hans Christian Andersen stories, folk dancers perform and instruct, and choral and instrumental groups perform traditional pieces. There are also language classes and the Scandia Run 10 km.

Traditional Scandinavian food includes vandbakkelser (chocolate dipped yum puffs), Æbleskiver, Swedish meatballs and Lefse.

Booths
The festival hosts myriad different stalls, taking up the bulk of the festival space. Most are lined along either side of the street, but some are set up indoors to offer shelter to escape either the sun or rain. Food stalls are the most popular attraction to the festival. The Æbleskiver booth and the meat pie booth are particularly well-known, and are seldom seen without a large crowd. Other booths include handcrafts such as Hardanger embroidery, bobbin lace, tatted lace, and Rosemaling are displayed and sold among paintings, needlework, and ceramics. Many handmade toys are displayed as well—puppets on strings, wooden swords, dolls, and others showcase toys from a bygone era that can still be enjoyed today.

The featured stalls are expected to match the authentic Scandinavian theme of the festival. There have been incidences in which owners of certain stalls have gotten in trouble for not maintaining this theme. One year, a lemonade stand designed their booth to look like a large lemon. As soon as the festival committee discovered this, they were asked to change the booth to match the theme, leading to an awkward—and unsuccessful—attempt to camouflage the giant lemon behind traditional Scandinavian decorations.

References

External links 
 Scandinavian Festival (official website)
Gale F. Fletchall Award

Tourist attractions in Lane County, Oregon
Festivals in Oregon
Scandinavia
Cultural festivals in the United States
Junction City, Oregon
Danish-American culture in Oregon
Finnish-American culture
Norwegian-American culture in Oregon
Swedish-American culture in Oregon
1961 establishments in Oregon
Annual events in Oregon